The 2013 FIBA Africa Basketball Club Championship (28th edition), is an international basketball tournament  held in Sousse, Tunisia from December 12 to 21, 2013. The tournament, organized by FIBA Africa and hosted by Étoile Sportive du Sahel was contested by 12 clubs split into 2 groups of six, the top four of which qualifying for the knock-out stage, quarter, semifinals and final.
 
Primeiro de Agosto from Angola was the winner.

Draw

Squads

Preliminary round

Times given below are in UTC+1.

Group A

{{Basketballbox
 | bg = #eee
 | date = December 17, 2013 | time = 10:00
 | report = Boxscore
 | teamA = Sporting  | scoreA = 101
 | teamB =  LPRC Oilers | scoreB = 65
 | Q1 = 24-11 | Q2 = 24-16 | Q3 = 30-22 | Q4 = 23-16
 | points1 = Alian 16 | rebounds1 = Ahmed 8 | assist1 = Tawfik 6
 | points2 = Davidson 14 | rebounds2 = Mbaimba 8 | assist2 = Mbaimba 3
 | place = Salle Olympique de Sousse | attendance = | referee = | series = 
}}

Group B

Knockout round

9th-12th place

Quarter-finals

11th place

9th place

5th-8th place

Semifinals

7th place

5th place

Bronze-medal game

Gold-medal game

Final standingsPrimeiro de Agosto roster'''Agostinho Coelho, Armando Costa, Cedric Isom, Edmir Lucas, Edson Ndoniema, Felizardo Ambrósio, Francisco Machado, Hermenegildo Santos, Islando Manuel, Joaquim Gomes, Mário Correia, Mutu Fonseca, Coach: Paulo Macedo

Statistical Leaders

All Tournament Team

See also 
2013 FIBA Africa Championship

References

External links 
 
 

2013 FIBA Africa Basketball Club Championship
2013 FIBA Africa Basketball Club Championship
2013 FIBA Africa Basketball Club Championship
International basketball competitions hosted by Tunisia